"The Deacon" is a Christian epithet applied to:

 Arsenius the Great (died 445), Roman imperial tutor and saint who became an anchorite in Egypt
 Avakum the Deacon (1794–1814), Serbian Orthodox monk, martyr and saint
 Benjamin the Deacon and Martyr (329–c. 424), deacon martyred in Persia
 Bermudo I of Asturias (c. 750–797), King of Asturias
 Habib the Deacon (died 308? or 310?), Syriac Christian martyr
 James the Deacon (died after 671), Roman deacon and saint
 John the Deacon (disambiguation)
 Leo the Deacon (c. 950–?), Byzantine Greek historian and chronicler
 Nicanor the Deacon (died 76), martyr and one of the Seven Deacons
 Nicolas the Deacon, claimed by some of the early Christian Church Fathers to be the author of the heresy and sect of Nicolaism
 Paul the Deacon (c. 720s–796, 797, 798 or 799), Benedictine monk, scribe and historian of the Lombards
 Paulinus the Deacon, notary of Ambrose of Milan and his biographer
 Peter the Deacon, librarian of the abbey of Montecassino and continuator of the Chronicon monasterii Casinensis (Monte Cassino Chronicle)
 Vincent of Saragossa (died. c. 304), saint and martyr

Deacon